Joachim Hermanus Jacobus Verberne (born 19 January 1978 in Alkmaar, North Holland) is a former rower from the Netherlands. He won a silver medal in the 2000 Summer Olympics in the Men's Quadruple Sculls.

References

External links
 
 
 

1978 births
Living people
Dutch male rowers
Olympic rowers of the Netherlands
Rowers at the 2000 Summer Olympics
Olympic silver medalists for the Netherlands
Sportspeople from Alkmaar
Olympic medalists in rowing
Medalists at the 2000 Summer Olympics
20th-century Dutch people
21st-century Dutch people